Ivonne Witteveen Kistemaker (born 22 January 1944) is a Dutch Antillean fencer. She competed in the women's individual foil event at the 1968 Summer Olympics.

References

External links
 

1944 births
Living people
Dutch Antillean female foil fencers
Olympic fencers of Netherlands Antilles
Fencers at the 1968 Summer Olympics
Curaçao female foil fencers